Loyn may refer to:

People
 David Loyn (born 1954)
 H. R. Loyn (1922–2000), British historian

Places
 Loyn Bridge, England

Other
 Loyn & Co